The 2014 Ulster Senior Hurling Championship was the 64th staging of the Ulster hurling championship since its establishment by the Ulster Council in 1901.

Antrim won.

Format
Five teams entered. Antrim as holders received a bye to the final, while the other four teams played off for the other final place.

Results

Ulster Senior Hurling Championship

This game was tied after the normal 20 minutes of extra time: Derry 4-20, Down 3-23. The teams agreed to play another 10 minutes of extra time, but the game was still tied after that, so they had a replay.

References

Ulster
Hurling
Ulster Senior Hurling Championship